The 2021–22 NC State Wolfpack women's basketball team represented North Carolina State University during the 2021–22 NCAA Division I women's basketball season. The Wolfpack were led by ninth-year head coach Wes Moore and played their home games at Reynolds Coliseum as members of the Atlantic Coast Conference.

The Wolfpack finished the season 32–4 overall and 17–1 in ACC play to finish as regular season champions.  As the first seed in the ACC tournament, they earned a bye to the Quarterfinals where they defeated ninth seed Florida State, then they defeated fifth seed Virginia Tech in the Semifinals, and they won the Final versus seven seed Miami to win their third straight tournament title.  As champions, they earned the ACC's automatic bid to the NCAA tournament where they were the first seed in the Bridgeport Region.  They defeated sixteen seed Longwood in the First Round, ninth seed Kansas State in the Second Round, and fifth seed Notre Dame in the Sweet Sixteen before losing to second seed UConn in the Elite Eight to end their season.

Previous season

The Wolfpack finished the season 22–3 and 12–2 in ACC play to finish in second place.  They won the ACC tournament defeating Virginia Tech, Georgia Tech, and Louisville along the way to their title.  It was NC State's sixth title in school history.  As ACC Tournament Champions, they received an automatic bid to the NCAA tournament where they were the one seed in the Mercado Regional.  In the tournament they defeated sixteen seed  in the First Round and eight seed South Florida before losing to four seed Indiana in the Sweet Sixteen to end their season.

Off-season

Departures

Incoming Transfers

Recruiting Class

Source:

Roster

Schedule

Source

|-
!colspan=6 style="background:#E00000; color:white;"| Exhibition

|-
!colspan=6 style="background:#E00000; color:white;"| Regular season

|-
!colspan=6 style="background:#E00000; color:white;"| ACC Tournament

|-
!colspan=6 style="background:#E00000; color:white;"| NCAA tournament

Rankings

Coaches did not release a Week 2 poll and AP does not release a final poll.

References

NC State Wolfpack women's basketball seasons
NC State
NC State Wolfpack women's basketball team
NC State Wolfpack women's basketball team
NC State